The 2014 New Zealand bravery awards were announced via a Special Honours List on 23 June 2014. All the recipients were recognised for acts of bravery following the magnitude 6.3 Christchurch earthquake that struck on 22 February 2011.

New Zealand Bravery Decoration (NZBD)
 Dr Bryan Curran – anaesthetist, Christchurch Hospital.
 Dr Lydia Grace Johns-Putra – urologist, Ballarat, Victoria, Australia.

New Zealand Bravery Medal (NZBM)
 Stephen Acton – senior firefighter, New Zealand Fire Service.
 Michael John Brooklands – sergeant, New Zealand Police.
 Luke Jonathan Burgess – senior firefighter, New Zealand Fire Service.
 Alan Maurice Butcher – station officer, New Zealand Fire Service. Posthumous award – died 18 October 2013.
 Lieutenant Commander Kevin Carr – Royal New Zealand Navy.
 Shane Andrew Cole – station officer, New Zealand Fire Service.
 Shane Allan Cowles – constable, New Zealand Police.
 Kevin Rex Crozier – senior firefighter, New Zealand Fire Service.
 Richard Mark Green – senior firefighter, New Zealand Fire Service.
 Terrence David Gyde – senior firefighter, New Zealand Fire Service.
 Craig Munro Jackson  – senior firefighter, New Zealand Fire Service.
 Danny Edward Johanson – senior constable, New Zealand Police.
 Michael Douglas Kneebone – constable, New Zealand Police.
 Joshua James Kumbaroff – firefighter, New Zealand Fire Service.
 Daniel James Lee - constable, New Zealand Police.
 Michael John Lennard – senior firefighter, New Zealand Fire Service.
 Simon James Payton – senior firefighter, New Zealand Fire Service.
 Richard Frank Platt – senior firefighter, New Zealand Fire Service.
 Paul John Rodwell – station officer, New Zealand Fire Service.
 Scott Martin Shadbolt – firefighter, New Zealand Fire Service.
 Steven David Smylie – senior firefighter, New Zealand Fire Service.
 Cory John Stewart – firefighter, New Zealand Fire Service.
 Anthony Wayne Tamakehu – owner of The Chainman, suppliers of specialist lifting and rigging equipment.
 Mark David Whittaker – senior firefighter, New Zealand Fire Service.
 Michael David Yeates – senior firefighter, New Zealand Fire Service.

References

Bravery
Bravery
New Zealand Bravery
Bravery